The 1883 Detroit Wolverines finished the season with a 40–58 record, good for seventh place in the National League.

Regular season

Season standings

Record vs. opponents

Roster

Player stats

Batting

Starters by position
Note: Pos = Position; G = Games played; AB = At bats; H = Hits; Avg. = Batting average; HR = Home runs; RBI = Runs batted in

Other batters
Note: G = Games played; AB = At bats; H = Hits; Avg. = Batting average; HR = Home runs; RBI = Runs batted in

Pitching

Starting pitchers
Note: G = Games pitched; IP = Innings pitched; W = Wins; L = Losses; ERA = Earned run average; SO = Strikeouts

Relief pitchers
Note: G = Games pitched; W = Wins; L = Losses; SV = Saves; ERA = Earned run average; SO = Strikeouts

Game log

|- bgcolor="#ffbbbb"
| 1 || May 1 || CHI || L || 4-7 || 0-1 || Wiedman
|- bgcolor="#ffbbbb"
| 2 || May 2 || CHI || L || 3-5 || 0-2 || Wiedman 
|- bgcolor="#ffbbbb"
| 3 || May 3 || CHI || L || 1-10 || 0-3 || Burns
|- bgcolor="#bbffbb"
| 4 || May 5 || @CHI || W || 3-2 || 1-3 || Wiedman 
|- bgcolor="#bbffbb"
| 5 || May 7 || @CHI || W || 7-0 || 2-3 || Wiedman
|- bgcolor="#bbffbb"
| 6 || May 9 || @CHI ||W ||17-7 || 3-3 || Wiedman
|- bgcolor="#bbffbb"
| 7 || May 11 ||NY ||W ||12-1 || 4-3||Wiedman 
|- bgcolor="#bbffbb"
| 8 || May 12 ||NY  ||W ||9-5 ||5-3 || Burns  
|- bgcolor="#ffbbbb"
| 9 || May 15 ||PHI ||L || 3-4||5-4 || Burns 
|- bgcolor="#bbffbb"
| 10 || May 16 ||PHI ||W ||11-10||6-4 || McIntyre
|- bgcolor="#bbffbb"
| 11 || May 17 ||PHI ||W ||12-6||7-4 || Wiedman 
|- bgcolor="#ffbbbb"
| 12 || May 18 ||NY || L || 6-11||7-5 || Burns
|- bgcolor="#bbffbb"
| 13 || May 19 ||PRO || W || 7-5||8-5 || Wiedman 
|- bgcolor="#bbffbb"
| 14 || May 23 ||PRO || W || 6-4||9-5 || Wiedman
|- bgcolor="#bbffbb"
| 15 || May 24 ||BOS || W || 5-1|| 10-5 || Wiedman
|- bgcolor="#bbffbb"
| 16 || May 25 ||BOS || W || 8-3||11-5 || Wiedman
|- bgcolor="#ffbbbb"
| 17 || May 28 ||BOS || L || 4-10||11-6 || Wiedman 
|- bgcolor="#bbffbb"
| 18 || May 30 ||@NY || W || 5-2 ||12-6 || Radbourn
|- bgcolor="#ffbbbb"
| 19 || May 30 ||@NY || L || 4-8||12-7 || Wiedman
|- bgcolor="#ffbbbb"
| 20 || May 31 ||@NY ||L  ||1-4 ||12-8 || Wiedman
|-

References

1883 Detroit Wolverines season at Baseball Reference

Detroit Wolverines seasons
Detroit Wolverines season
Detroit Wolv
1880s in Detroit